Evdokimov is a lunar impact crater on the far side of the Moon. It lies to the east of the crater Evershed, and west-southwest of Gadomski. This is a worn and eroded feature with a somewhat indistinct outer rim that is little more than a slight ridge in the surface. The rim is better formed along the western and eastern sides. A small crater with a relatively high albedo lies along the inner wall to the northeast, and is surrounded by a small, bright skirt of ejecta. The interior floor is nearly featureless, with only a few indistinct small crater rims marking the surface.

Satellite craters
By convention these features are identified on lunar maps by placing the letter on the side of the crater midpoint that is closest to Evdokimov.

References

 
 
 
 
 
 
 
 
 
 
 
 

Impact craters on the Moon